John Edward Graham is an Australian politician. He is a Labor member of the New South Wales Legislative Council since October 2016, when he was appointed to fill the vacancy resulting from the resignation of Sophie Cotsis to contest the Canterbury state by-election. On 8 June 2021, Graham became the deputy leader of the opposition in the Legislative Council. Additionally, he currently serves as the Shadow Special Minister of State, Shadow Minister for Roads, and Shadow Minister for Music and the Night Time Economy.

Prior to his appointment to the Legislative Council, he was the assistant general secretary of the New South Wales branch of the Australian Labor Party. He has previously worked as an adviser to NSW and Queensland state governments, including as the Deputy Chief of Staff to Former NSW Premier Nathan Rees. He also worked in the higher education sector and for the Finance Sector Union. He is a founder of Labor Loves Live Music.

Graham was considered for preselection for Canterbury, and was confident he had the support of the rank-and-file members, however Cotsis was preselected after NSW Labor leader Luke Foley intervened over concerns that Graham lived in Redfern (in the electorate of Newtown) and Foley wanted the candidate to be a woman.

Graham is married to federal senator Jenny McAllister. He is a member of NSW Labor's left faction.

References

External links
Facebook Page
Twitter Account

Year of birth missing (living people)
Living people
Labor Left politicians
Members of the New South Wales Legislative Council
Australian Labor Party members of the Parliament of New South Wales
Australian Labor Party officials
21st-century Australian politicians